Krševica is a village in the municipality of Bujanovac of the Pčinja District, Serbia. According to the 2002 there were 486 people (1991: 549 inhabitants). The archaeological site of Kale-Krševica is located in the village, the remnations of a 5th-century BC Ancient Greek Macedon city.

References

Populated places in Pčinja District